Jack Draper was the defending champion but chose not to defend his title.

Seeds

Draw

Finals

Top half

Bottom half

References

External links
Main draw
Qualifying draw

Open Saint-Brieuc - 1
2023 Singles